The KM2000  (KM designates Kampfmesser, literally "combat knife") is the standard combat knife of the German Bundeswehr, mostly used by the German Army. The knife is manufactured in Germany by the Eickhorn-Solingen company (aka "Original Eickhorn").

The knife is produced according to NATO regulations by the German company Eickhorn-Solingen Ltd. The assembly consists of three components: the laser cut 172 mm Black Kalgard coated, forged X55CrMo14 or 1.4110 (440A) stainless steel Westernized tanto blade, the ergonomic ambidextrous polyamide handle and screw. The sheath for the KM2000 is turnable, and includes an adapter to allow it to be mounted onto the MOLLE/PALS load bearing system(s).

The KM2000 owes a lot of its fame to the fact that it is among the few (if not the only) "tantō"-style military knives actually issued in significant numbers.

Based on the popularity of the design, Eickhorn has developed the line-up introducing many variations in shape, material used, colours. Later revisions of the KM2000 (as of 2008) use a different stainless blade steel alloy with better edge-holding properties, X105CrMo17 or 1.4125 (440C) Böhler N695 (HRC 57). Additionally, Eickhorn has introduced several new variants, like the KM1000 without a blade-coating, and the KM3000 with a spear-point blade instead of the KM2000's westernized-tanto point. The latter two are also being produced with sand-colored grips and scabbards intended in desert environments like Afghanistan. The newer version of KM2000 with improved Bohler N695 steel blade also has variants for desert environment and is named as Desert Command I knife, same is for KM3000 as well. Apart from hard polyamide sheath a special Leather sheath is available from Eickhorn. Models other than KM2000 are also introduced by Eickhorn such as Para-Commando, KM5000, FS knife etc. Most of these variations are not actually issued in the German Army. The newer version of KM2000 has modified tip for greater strength and stability while thrusting and prying windows and containers open. The blade of both models has two versions plain and partially serrated. The serrations are used for cutting ropes and fabric fibers for survival techniques. The scabbard has a strip of diamond sharpener used for field sharpening of knife. The handle end has a glass breaker tip which is actually the end of the knife blade tang. The handle end also has a lanyard hole. The scabbard is MOLLE and IDZ military vest compatible.

Dimensions:
Blade: 172mm long x ??mm wide x 5mm thick
Overall: 305mm long x ??mm thick
Weight - Knife only: 320 grams
Weight - w/ Scabbard: 550 grams

External links

 the homepage of the Bundeswehr (German)
 KM2000 on the Eickhorn-Solingen site (German)
 Pictures of the Kampfmesser 2000

Military knives
Post–Cold War weapons of Germany